Adam Auckland (born 23 January 1993) is an English professional squash player. He achieved his highest career PSA singles ranking of 105 in May 2014.

References

External links 

 Profile at PSA
 

1993 births
Living people
English male squash players
Sportspeople from Grimsby